The men's 10 metre air pistol event at the 2016 Summer Olympics took place on 6 August 2016 at the National Shooting Center.

The event consisted of two rounds: a qualification and a final. In the qualification round, each shooter fired 60 shots with an air pistol at 10 metres distance. Scores for each shot were in increments of 1, with a maximum score of 10. The top-eight shooters in the qualification round advanced to the final round, where they fired an additional 20 shots. Scores for each shot were in increments of 0.1, with a maximum score of 10.9.

Vietnamese shooter Hoàng Xuân Vinh set an Olympic record based on ISSF Rule changed on 1 January 2013  in the final round with a score of 202.5 (again, an Olympic record), winning the first-ever gold medal for his country in the history of the Olympic Games.

The medals were presented by Mamadou Diagna Ndiaye, IOC member, Senegal and Franz Schreiber, Secretary General of the International Shooting Sport Federation.

Records
Prior to this competition, the existing world and Olympic records were as follows:

The following records were established during the competition:

Qualification round

Final

References

Shooting at the 2016 Summer Olympics
Men's events at the 2016 Summer Olympics